The team eventing at the 1976 Summer Olympics took place between 23 and 25 July. The event was open to men and women. The competition included three segments: dressage, cross-country, and show-jumping. Penalties from each were summed to give a total score. Scores from the top 3 horse and rider pairs for each nation were summed to give a team score; the lowest pair's score was dropped. Teams without at least 3 finishing pairs were not given a final score.

The competition was split into three phases:

Dressage (23 July)
Riders performed the dressage test.
Endurance (24 July)
Riders tackled roads and tracks, steeplechase and cross-country portions.
Jumping (25 July)
Riders jumped at the show jumping course.

Results

References

Equestrian at the 1976 Summer Olympics